Krzysztof Morsztyn Sr. (1522–1600) of the Leliwa coat of arms, was founder of the Polish Brethren community in Filipów in 1585.

He was father of:
 Krzysztof Morsztyn Jr. (c.1580–1642) who taught at the Racovian Academy.
 Elżbieta Morsztyn who married Fausto Sozzini in 1586, but died within a year, after giving birth to a daughter, Agnieszka Sozzini, later mother of Andrzej Wiszowaty.

References

 Polish Biographical Dictionary (Polski Słownik Biograficzny) Vol. 21, p. 818.
  Hr. Seweryn Uruski: "Morsztynowie herbu Leliwa. Rodzina."  Herbarz szlachty polskiej Vol. 11, pp. 272-278.

1522 births
1600 deaths
Polish Unitarians